Hujialou Subdistrict is a subdistrict of Chaoyang District, Beijing, China. It is located south of Sanlitun and Tuanjiehu Subdistricts, west of Balizhuang Subdistrict, north of Jianwai Subdistrict, and east of Chaowai Subdistrict. The 2020 population of the subdistrict was 50,318.

Name 
This area used to be called Huanggufen, as for which royalty was buried here is unknown. Around the end of Qing dynasty, A family with the surname Hu constructed a prominent building that can be seen from afar, and as time went on, Hujialou became the name of this area.

History

Administrative Division 
As of 2021, there are a total of 11 communities within the subdistrict:

References 

Chaoyang District, Beijing
Subdistricts of Beijing